Although the NHL teams played against Soviet league teams during the Super Series between 1976 and 1991, there were no games between post-Soviet and NHL teams until 2008, when Metallurg Magnitogorsk played against the New York Rangers for the 2008 Victoria Cup. Two years later, in 2010, marked the first time since 1990 that NHL teams played games on post-Soviet ice.

List of games

See also
NHL Challenge
List of international ice hockey competitions featuring NHL players
List of international games played by NHL teams
Victoria Cup

References

External links
KHL versus NHL official website
A list of all international NHL games on the IIHF website

NHL
KHL
KHL